California's 21st State Senate district is one of 40 California State Senate districts. It is currently represented by Republican Scott Wilk of Santa Clarita.

District profile 
The district encompasses northern Los Angeles County and parts of the High Desert. It includes most of the Antelope, Victor, and Santa Clarita Valleys.

Los Angeles County – 6.1%
 Lancaster
 Palmdale
 Santa Clarita – 80.2%

San Bernardino County – 16.3%
 Adelanto
 Apple Valley
 Hesperia
 Victorville

Election results from statewide races

List of senators 
Due to redistricting, the 21st district has been moved around different parts of the state. The current iteration resulted from the 2011 redistricting by the California Citizens Redistricting Commission.

Election results 1992 - present

2020

2016

2015 (special)

2012

2008

2004

2000

1996

1992

See also 
 California State Senate
 California State Senate districts
 Districts in California

References

External links 
 District map from the California Citizens Redistricting Commission

21
Government of Los Angeles County, California
Government of San Bernardino County, California
Antelope Valley
Mojave Desert
Victor Valley
Hesperia, California
Lancaster, California
Palmdale, California
Santa Clarita, California
Victorville, California